Gujarat Cancer & Research Institute (GCRI) is a state owned-cancer research institute in Gujarat, India. It was established in 1972. It is one of the 25 government funded Regional Cancer Centres in India.

History 
Conceived as a Charitable Trust with the support of the then governor of Gujarat Shri. Mehdi Nawab Jung in the year 1961 and started a 50 bedded M.P. Shah Cancer Hospital by Gujarat Cancer Society with a donation by M.P. Shah Trust, London. In the year 1965, the Gujarat Cancer Society handed over the Cancer Hospital to Govt. of Gujarat for better management since functional under the Civil Hospital, Ahmedabad. The State Govt. decided to take over the complete control of the cancer hospital from 15 February 1966 vide GR Panchayant & Health Dept. dated 2 February 1966

Autonomous Status as GCRI:

In the year 1971 vide GR, Panchayat & Health Dept. dated 16 October 1971, Govt. of Gujarat converted this hospital into an Autonomous Body through a tripartite agreement between Govt. of Gujarat, Gujarat Cancer Society and a new body called 'Gujarat Cancer & Research Institute' with 100% Grant-in-Aid from Govt. of Gujarat with all recurring and non-recurring expenses towards the running and maintenance and development and expansion of the institute respectively.

Mission 
The mission of the GCRI is to provide state-of-the art diagnostic and therapeutic services to the patients of all types of origin and financial background suffering from cancer. Its scope also encompasses registering the tumor burden in the population, prevention through awareness drives, solving local medical problems through research and training of medical students as well as imparting knowledge to the medical fraternity.

To fulfil the mission, GCRI

 Conducts OPD and indoor activities for diagnosis, staging, treatment and monitoring disease progress.
 Renders free or subsidized treatment to needy patients without any distinction of caste, creed or religion.
 Provides training to new generation of doctors as well as practicing fraternity.
 Offers unique experimental and research-oriented diagnosis and treatment services to test new forms of diagnosis and therapy in order to improve quality of life and expected survival of those afflicted with cancer.
 Organizes public education programs, the diagnostic and blood donation camps, conferences and other scientific meets.
 Displays a permanent Cancer Awareness and Anti-tobacco exhibition and arranges other preventive efforts.
 Runs instruction based Hospice Centre, Home-Hospice Services and Rehabilitation Service.

Vision 
GCRI, with a multi-disciplinary close relationship between cancer care, research and education, intends to provide the greatest hope to the patients and the general population. GCRI believes that the world class cancer research, state of art therapeutic efforts and intensive and extensive educational efforts regarding prevention, detection, treatment and palliation in the field of cancer will improve the quality of life of all those who suffer from it. GCRI collaboration believes that with other cancer organizations, research laboratories and pharma-research establishments will bring a better tomorrow.

Actualization of Vision

The GCRI has to catch up with ever-changing rapid pace of growth in patients as well as technologies. The growing need to undertake larger number of research projects to enhance the understanding of this dreadful disease. Lastly, a lot need to be done to educate masses for prevention and early diagnosis of the disease.

GCRI is a 650-bedded comprehensive cancer center with various departments including Surgical Oncology, Medical Oncology, Pediatric Oncology, Gynec Oncology, Radiation Oncology, Radio diagnosis, Anesthesiology, Research Wing, Laboratory Medicine, Preventive oncology, Nursing & Allied Services, Stoma Clinic, Physiotherapy, Speech Therapy, Prosthesis, Social Service, Cancer related Health Check-up.

At GCRI, major focus is given on all major and rare forms of cancers. GCRI is known for its expertise in treating major cancers like Head & Neck, Cervix and Breast cancers (these cancers make up 60% of the total prevalent cases of cancer). GCRI is also known for its expertise in Haemato Oncology. Thus diagnostic and treatment care at GCRI is well oriented to provide optimal cancer care specifically for these cancers.

Keeping pace with advancement in technology the institute has also established “Neuro Oncology Department” and “Bone Marrow" Transplantation Unit. GCRI has a multidisciplinary group dedicated to the care of patients with primary brain tumors, brain metastases, and neurological complications of cancer. It is the only multidisciplinary institute providing comprehensive brain cancer care in Gujarat and has gained regional and national recognition.

A Regional Cancer Centre 
In view of the availability of comprehensive cancer facilities in the Western Part of India and progress made by Gujarat Cancer & Research Institute, Ministry of Health & Family Welfare Govt. of India has recognized this Institute as 'Regional Cancer Centre' in the year 1982 and granted yearly financial support for capital expenses.

Today, Gujarat Cancer & Research Institute is one of the largest Cancer Care Centre in India providing most modern and high tech cancer prevention, diagnosis and treatment facilities and is the only Centre running with the support of Govt. of Gujarat for the poor and needy cancer patients of Gujarat and adjoining States of India.

A State Cancer Centre 
In the year 2013, Government of India has given Status as State Cancer Institute and has provided financial Assistance of Rs.120 Crore for Development of the Institute under NPCDCS. (National Programme for Prevention and control of Cancer, Diabetes, Cardiovascular Disease and Stroke)

Cancer Statistics

World:

Cancers figure among the leading causes of morbidity and mortality worldwide, with approximately 14 million new cases and 8.2 million cancer related deaths in 2012. And it is expected that annual cancer cases will rise from 14 million in 2012 to 22 within the next 2 decades.

India:

Cancer prevalence is 70-90 cases per one lakh population. It is estimated that there are nearly 25 lakh cancer cases at any given point of time. Cancer has become one of the ten leading causes of death in India and approximately 6.8 lakh deaths occur annually due to cancer.

In India, leading cancer site among male is lung, stomach and oral cavity while among female it is cervical and breast cancer. A total of 48% of all cancer in men and 20% in women were directly attributable to the use of tobacco.

Ahmedabad:

Data from Ahmedabad urban cancer registry indicates that the prevalence of cancer among male and female is 116 & 85 cases per one lakh population respectively. The most common cancer among male is oral cavity, tongue, lung, oesophagus and larynx while among female it is breast, cervical, tongue and oral cavity cancer. A total of 56% of all cancer in men and 16% in women were directly attributable to the use of tobacco.   

Data from Ahmedabad rural cancer registry indicate that the prevalence of cancer among male and female is 79 & 50 cases per one lakh population respectively. The most common cancer among male is oral cavity, tongue, lung, hypo pharynx and oesophagus while among female it is breast, cervical, oral cavity, ovary and tongue cancer. 62% of male cancer and 20% of female cancer were directly attributable to the use of tobacco.

GCRI:

The Gujarat Cancer & Research Institute (GCRI) which is also designated as The State Cancer Institute (SCI). Everyday patients are attended in outdoor setting at GCRI. As per our data majority i.e. more than 45% of patients collectively accounts for Oral Cancer, Breast Cancer and Cervical Cancer (Table 1), which makes our primary priority to do awareness and diagnostic activities for these cancers.

Activities

Patient Management

Diagnostic facilities 
GCRI is having all the latest diagnostic facilities including latest PET scan and CT scan machines. It is also having IHC facility for the cancer detection. The Institute also has a bone marrow transplantation unit, endoscopy unit with flexible fiber-optic video endoscopes, colposcopes, spiral CT Scan, PET Scan, linear accelerators, high dose and microselectrons and a mammograph machine.

Treatment facilities:

Treatment component includes

A. Surgical Oncology:

General Surgery:

GCRI is having all the state of art instruments for latest cancer surgeries with fully equipped operation theatres. GCRI has added video assisted surgery also for the cancer care.

GCRI has started different units as per the site of the cancer which are:

 Breast Cancer Unit
 Head & Neck Unit and
 Gastro-intestinal Track and Hepatobiliary Cancer

Super-specialty Onco-surgical Department:

•      GCRI is having separate super-specialty department to comprehensive care of that particular specialty.

Neurosurgery:

•      Supermajor, Major and Minor surgeries were performed. The department also provides emergency services to the patients.

Orthopedic Surgery:

•      Special Orthopedic OPDs and Surgeries are there in GCRI who is looking after cancers related to bone and soft tissues.

Plastic Surgery:

•      Reconstructive surgeries for head and neck cancer patients with the help of neurosurgeons were done.

Paediatric Oncology Surgery:

•      A separate unit for paediatric related cancer surgery is established

B. Radiotherapy :

The radiotherapy department is fully equipped with three 6MV electa linear accelerators, one varian 6MV linear accelerator, one cobalt machine, with facilities for three dimensional conformal radiotherapy (3DCRT), intensity modulated radiotherapy (IMRT), stereotactic radiotherapy (SRT) and stereotactic radiosurgery (SRC), one contact therapy machine, one low dose rate (LDR) brachytherapy unit, three microselectron high dose rate (HDR) brachytherapy unit, two electa simulator machines, one Siemens CT Simulator machine.

C. Medical and Pediatric Oncology:

Chemotherapy:

GCRI is having fully functional Medical and Pediatric Oncology department where all the latest chemotherapy medicines are given for all kind of cancers as per the guidelines. Well trained and well educated medical and paramedical staff is working for Day care chemotherapy, high dose chemotherapy, targeted therapy as well as biological therapy.

Pediatric Oncology:

A separate pediatric Oncolology ward and staff is assigned in the GCRI where children are treated with love, care and in homely environment.

Bone Marrow transplant:

Bone Marrow Transplantation is having state of art equipments and experienced and well trained staff. Bone Marrow Examination were done at GCRI. Bone Marrow Transplantation procedures were done to save the life of the cancer patients.

D. Gynec Oncology:

For Female cancers, GCRI is having special fully functional and well experienced Gynec Oncology department. This department is looking after all the activities related to gynecological cancers like OPD, wards and surgeries. The department is also working for screening (early diagnosis) of cancer. MCH in Gynec Oncology has also been started from 2016.

E. Nuclear Medicine:

The department is equipped with Gamma Camera Dual head, PET-CT scanner (Discovery 600), Three Dose Calibrator, Survey Meter, Surface Contamination monitor, L-bench, Thyroid Uptake system, Two Fume Hood (one in radio-pharmacy other in iodine therapy ward), Decontamination Kit, Lead lined decay drum, Four lead barrier for I-131 therapy ward and Pocket dosimeter.

F. Palliative & Rehabilitative:

Palliative treatment:

GCRI is having fully functional and well staffed palliative medicine department for terminally ill patients as well as counseling of the cancer patients and their relatives.

This department also functions in following areas:

Hospice Care:

At Community Oncology Centre, Vasna; a Hospice care centre is set up to provide homely environment and empathic care to the terminally ill cancer patients. There are total 20 such beds at hospice care centre where free of cost treatment is given to the terminally ill cancer patients. Here, proper care is given to the patients by experienced staff by having an empathetic approach. Bed Occupancy rate at hospice centre remains around 60-65%.

Home care:

A team of doctor, nurse and counselor pays visit to patients and carers at home and guide them about care of patient in their own home. This team from palliative Medicine department visits to the home of the patients residing in the Ahmedabad and Gandhinagar city area. This decreases trouble of the patients and their relatives by reducing travelling to the hospital, helps patients to be treated in homely environment and environmental as well as other factors can be assessed by expert team during their home visits. Lonely, elderly and neglected cancer patients are also taken care at their home by our team.

References 

Hospital buildings completed in 1972
Government buildings completed in 1972
Research institutes in Ahmedabad
Regional Cancer Centres in India
Hospitals in Gujarat
Healthcare in Ahmedabad
Research institutes in Gujarat
1972 establishments in Gujarat
20th-century architecture in India